Herman Boerhaave (31 December 1668 – 23 September 1738) was a Dutch botanist, chemist, Christian humanist, and physician of European fame. He is regarded as the founder of clinical teaching and of the modern academic hospital and is sometimes referred to as "the father of physiology," along with Venetian physician Santorio Santorio (1561–1636). Boerhaave introduced the quantitative approach into medicine, along with his pupil Albrecht von Haller (1708–1777) and is best known for demonstrating the relation of symptoms to lesions. He was the first to isolate the chemical urea from urine. He was the first physician to put thermometer measurements to clinical practice. His motto was Simplex sigillum veri: 'Simplicity is the sign of the truth'. He is often hailed as the "Dutch Hippocrates".

Biography

Boerhaave was born at Voorhout near Leiden. The son of a Protestant pastor, in his youth Boerhaave studied for a divinity degree and wanted to become a preacher. After the death of his father, however, he was offered a scholarship and he entered the University of Leiden, where he took his master's degree in philosophy in 1690, with a dissertation titled De distinctione mentis a corpore (On the Difference of the Mind from the Body). There he attacked the doctrines of Epicurus, Thomas Hobbes and Baruch Spinoza. He then turned to the study of medicine. He earned his medical doctorate from the University of Harderwijk (present-day Gelderland) in 1693, with a dissertation titled De utilitate explorandorum in aegris excrementorum ut signorum (The Utility of Examining Signs of Disease in the Excrement of the Sick).

In 1701 he was appointed lecturer on the institutes of medicine at Leiden; in his inaugural discourse, De commendando Hippocratis studio, he recommended to his pupils that great physician as their model. In 1709 he became professor of botany and medicine, and in that capacity he did good service, not only to his own university, but also to botanical science, by his improvements and additions to the botanic garden of Leiden, and by the publication of numerous works descriptive of new species of plants.

On 14 September 1710, Boerhaave married Maria Drolenvaux, the daughter of the rich merchant, Alderman Abraham Drolenvaux. They had four children, of whom one daughter, Maria Joanna, lived to adulthood.  In 1722, he began to suffer from an extreme case of gout, recovering the next year.

In 1714, when he was appointed rector of the university, he succeeded Govert Bidloo in the chair of practical medicine, and in this capacity he introduced the modern system of clinical instruction. Four years later he was appointed to the chair of chemistry as well. In 1728 he was elected into the French Academy of Sciences, and two years later into the Royal Society of London. In 1729 declining health obliged him to resign the chairs of chemistry and botany; and he died, after a lingering and painful illness, at Leiden.

Legacy
His reputation so increased the fame of the University of Leiden, especially as a school of medicine, that it became popular with visitors from every part of Europe. All the princes of Europe sent him pupils, who found in this skilful professor not only an indefatigable teacher, but an affectionate guardian. When Peter the Great went to Holland in 1716 (he was in Holland before in 1697 to instruct himself in maritime affairs), he also took lessons from Boerhaave. Voltaire travelled to see him, as did Carl Linnaeus, who became a close friend and named the genus Boerhavia for him. His reputation was not confined to Europe; a Chinese mandarin sent him a letter addressed to "the illustrious Boerhaave, physician in Europe," and it reached him in due course.

The operating theatre of the University of Leiden in which he once worked as an anatomist is now at the centre of a museum named after him; the Boerhaave Museum. Asteroid 8175 Boerhaave is named after Boerhaave. From 1955 to 1961 Boerhaave's image was printed on Dutch 20-guilder banknotes. The Leiden University Medical Centre organises medical trainings called Boerhaave-courses.

He had a prodigious influence on the development of medicine and chemistry in Scotland. British medical schools credit Boerhaave for developing the system of medical education upon which their current institutions are based. Every founding member of the Edinburgh Medical School had studied at Leyden and attended Boerhaave's lectures on chemistry including John Rutherford and Francis Home. Boerhaave's Elementa Chemiae (1732) is recognised as the first text on chemistry.  
 
Boerhaave first described Boerhaave syndrome, which involves tearing of the oesophagus, usually a consequence of vigorous vomiting. Notoriously, in 1724 he described the case of Baron Jan van Wassenaer, a Dutch admiral who died of this condition following a gluttonous feast and subsequent regurgitation. The condition was uniformly fatal prior to modern surgical techniques allowing repair of the oesophagus.

Boerhaave was critical of his Dutch contemporary Baruch Spinoza, attacking him in his 1688 dissertation. At the same time, he admired Isaac Newton and was a devout Christian who often wrote about God in his works. A collection of his religious thoughts on medicine, translated from Latin to English, has been compiled by the Sir Thomas Browne Instituut Leiden under the name Boerhaave's Orations (meaning "Boerhaave's Prayers"). Among other things, he considered nature as God's Creation and he used to say that the poor were his best patients because God was their paymaster.

Medical contributions
Boerhaave devoted himself intensively to the study of the human body. He was strongly influenced by the mechanistic theories of René Descartes, and those of the 17th-century astronomer and mathematician Giovanni Borelli, who described animal movements in terms of mechanical motion. On such premises Boerhaave proposed a hydraulic model of human physiology. His writings refer to simple machines such as levers and pulleys and similar mechanisms, and he saw the bodily organs and members as being assembled from pipe-like structures. The physiology of veins, for example, he compared to the operation of pipes. He asserted the importance of a proper balance of fluid pressure, noting that fluids should be able to move around the body freely, without obstacles. For its well-being the body needed to be self-regulating, so as to maintain a healthy state of equilibrium. Boerhaave's concept of the body as apparatus centred his medical attention on material problems rather than upon ontological or esoteric explanations of illness.

Boerhaave's teaching of his knowledge and philosophy drew many students to the University of Leiden. He emphasised the importance of anatomical research based on practical observation and scientific experiment. His concept of the bodily system took hold throughout Europe, and helped to transform medical education in the European schools. His insights aroused great interest among other critical medical thinkers, not least in Friedrich Hoffmann, who strongly advocated the importance of physico-mechanical principles for the preservation or indeed the restoration of health. As a professor at Leiden, Boerhaave influenced many students. Some in their experiments upheld and furthered his philosophy, while others rejected it and proposed alternative theories of human physiology. He produced a great many textbooks and writings through which the digested brilliance of his lectures at Leiden was circulated widely in Europe. In 1708 his publication of the Institutiones Medicae was issued in over five languages, and went into approximately ten editions. His Elementa Chemia, a world-renowned chemistry textbook, was published in 1732.

The mechanistic concept of the human body departed from the age-old precepts laid down by Galen and Aristotle. In place of a servile dependence upon teachings handed down from antiquity, Boerhaave understood the importance of establishing definitive findings through his own investigation, and by the direct application of his own methods of testing. This new reasoning expanded the field of Renaissance anatomy: it opened the way to reforms of medical practice and understanding in the field of iatrochemistry.

Works 

Oratio academica qua probatur, bene intellectam a Cicerone et confutatam esse sententiam Epicuri de summo bono (Leiden, 1688)
Het Nut der Mechanistische Methode in de Geneeskunde (Leiden, 1703)
Institutiones medicae (Leiden, 1708)
Aphorismi de cognoscendis et curandis morbis (Leiden, 1709), on which his pupil and assistant, Gerard van Swieten (1700–1772) published a commentary in 5 vols.
 
 
 
 
Institutiones et Experimenta chemiae (Paris, 1724) (unauthorised). (Digital edition by the University and State Library Düsseldorf)

References

 Guggenheim, K. Y. "Herman Boerhaave on nutrition." The Journal of Nutrition 118, no. 2 (1988): 141-143. 
 Mendelsohn, Everett (2003). Transformation and Tradition in the Sciences. Cambridge University Press. 
 Rina Knoeff (2002), "Herman Boerhaave (1668–1783): Calvinist chemist and physician." History of Science and Scholarship in the Netherlands, Volume 3. Royal Netherlands Academy of Arts and Sciences.
 Underwood, E. Ashworth. "Boerhaave After Three Hundred Years." The British Medical Journal 4, no. 5634 (1968): 820–25.

Further reading

External links

 
Samuel Johnson's 1739 biography of him online: Life of Herman Boerhaave
Museum Boerhaave in Leiden, National Museum of the History of Science and Medicine
A recent discussion of Boerhaave's Syndrome in the New England Journal of Medicine (subscription required)
 
 
Works at Open Library
 
"Aphorismi de Cognoscendis et Curandis Morbis" (1709; “Aphorisms on the Recognition and Treatment of Diseases”)
"Elementa Chemiae" (1733) (Elements of Chemistry)
"A New Method of Chemistry" (1741 & 1753) (English Translation of "Elementa Chemiae" by Peter Shaw)
Javed Chaudhry Article about Herman Boerhaave

1668 births
1738 deaths
17th-century Dutch physicians
17th-century Dutch writers
18th-century Dutch physicians
18th-century Dutch writers
Burials at Pieterskerk, Leiden
17th-century Dutch anatomists
18th-century Dutch anatomists
17th-century Dutch botanists
18th-century Dutch botanists
18th-century Dutch chemists
Dutch Christians
Dutch entomologists
Dutch Renaissance humanists
Fellows of the Royal Society
Leiden University alumni
Academic staff of Leiden University
Members of the French Academy of Sciences
People from Teylingen
University of Harderwijk alumni
Writers about religion and science